Jérémy Rencurel (born 13 April 1995) is a French BMX rider. He competed at the 2016 Summer Olympics in the men's BMX race, in which he was eliminated in the quarterfinals.

References

External links
 
 
 
 

1995 births
Living people
French male cyclists
Olympic cyclists of France
Cyclists at the 2016 Summer Olympics
BMX riders